Peggy is an unincorporated community in Atascosa County, Texas, United States. According to the Handbook of Texas, the community had a population of 22 in 2000. It is located within the San Antonio metropolitan area.

History
Peggy was founded in the early 1930s when mesquite and brush was cleared out for farmland by laborers at the demands of H.R. Smith and John Mowinkle. A store named Hollywood was built in the community to serve current residents and the needs of other workers. A gin was also built across the road. This community was named Hollywood for several years until a post office was established in the late 1930s and was named for John Mowinkle's niece. It had one business and a population of 25 in 1939. It gained another business in 1943 with the same population. It rose to 50 by 1961 then decreased to 20 by 1968. It was that same number in 1990 with a store, the post office, and a farm machine shop. Its population was 22 in 2000.
  
Although it is unincorporated, Peggy has a post office with the ZIP code 78062.

Geography

Education
Public education in the community of Peggy is provided by the Karnes City Independent School District.

References

Unincorporated communities in Atascosa County, Texas
Unincorporated communities in Texas
Greater San Antonio